William Ascroft (1832–1914) was a late 19th century British landscape painter best known for his colour sketches commissioned by the Royal Academy of Arts of sunsets over Chelsea in England in the years after the 1883 explosion of the Krakatoa volcano, recording details otherwise unavailable before the invention of colour photography. Ascroft was known to sketch the sky at sunset regularly, and made a total of more than 500 works detailing the red skies post-eruption.

References

External links 
On-line images of some of Ascroft's sunset sketches
Chromolithographic plates from: The eruption of Krakatoa, and subsequent phenomena. Report of the Krakatoa Committee of the Royal Society edited by G J Symons, London, 1888.

1832 births
1914 deaths
British illustrators